Major-General Robert Hutchison, 1st Baron Hutchison of Montrose,  (5 September 1873 – 13 June 1950), was a Scottish soldier and Liberal politician.

Background
Hutchison was the son of Alexander Hutchison, of Braehead, Kirkcaldy, Fife. His younger brother Sir Balfour Hutchison (1889–1967) was a lieutenant general in the British Army.

Military career
Hutchison was a lieutenant in the Fife Artillery, a Militia regiment, when he received a regular commission as a second lieutenant in the 7th Dragoon Guards on 10 February 1900. He was promoted to lieutenant on 3 October 1900. The following year he was seconded to the Imperial Yeomanry, serving in the Second Boer War in South Africa, where he was appointed lieutenant and adjutant of the 12th Battalion on 25 November 1901, with the temporary rank of captain from the same day. He relinquished his appointment as adjutant and his temporary appointment as captain on 12 May 1902, shortly before the end of the war, and left Cape Town the following month, returning home on SS Plassy. In late August he was back with his regiment. He was promoted to the substantive rank of captain with the 11th Hussars in 1905 and major with the 4th Dragoon Guards in 1912. He was a General Staff Officer, 3rd Grade, 1912–1914, and promoted to 2nd Grade in 1914. He served in the First World War as General Staff Officer, 1st Grade, 1915–1917; temporary major general and Director of Organisation at the War Office from May 1917 to 1919; DAG 1919. He was Mentioned in Despatches six times, and awarded the Distinguished Service Order in 1915, appointed a Companion of the Order of the Bath in 1918, and knighted as a Knight Commander of the Order of St Michael and St George in 1919. He was also awarded the Belgian Order of the Crown and Croix de guerre, the French Legion of Honour, and the American Army Distinguished Service Medal. He retired in 1923.

Political career
Hutchison was National Liberal Member of Parliament for Kirkcaldy Burghs from 1922 to 1923, Liberal member for Montrose Burghs from 1924 to 1931 and Liberal National member for that constituency from 1931 to 1932. He served as Scottish National Liberal Whip in 1923, as a Liberal Whip from 1924 to 1926 and as Chief Liberal Whip from 1926 to 1930. On his retirement from the House of Commons in 1932, he was raised to the peerage as Baron Hutchison of Montrose, of Kirkcaldy in the County of Fife. He later served under Stanley Baldwin and Neville Chamberlain as Paymaster-General from 1935 to 1938 and was appointed a Privy Counsellor in 1937.

Apart from his military and political careers he was a director of the National Bank of Australasia, Phœnix Assurance Co., and other business interests.

Personal life
Lord Hutchison of Montrose married firstly Agnes, daughter of William Drysdale, in 1905. After her death he married secondly Alma, daughter of W. G. Cowes, in 1942. He died in June 1950, aged 76, when the barony became extinct.

References

External links
 

1873 births
1950 deaths
Hutchison of Montrose, Robert Hutchison, 1st Baron
British Army cavalry generals of World War I
British Army personnel of the Second Boer War
Companions of the Distinguished Service Order
Companions of the Order of the Bath
Foreign recipients of the Distinguished Service Medal (United States)
Knights Commander of the Order of St Michael and St George
Recipients of the Legion of Honour
Members of the Parliament of the United Kingdom for Scottish constituencies
Members of the Privy Council of the United Kingdom
Recipients of the Croix de guerre (Belgium)
Recipients of the Order of the Crown (Belgium)
UK MPs 1922–1923
UK MPs 1924–1929
UK MPs 1929–1931
UK MPs 1931–1935
UK MPs who were granted peerages
National Liberal Party (UK, 1922) politicians
Recipients of the Distinguished Service Medal (US Army)
Barons created by George V
Ministers in the Chamberlain peacetime government, 1937–1939